Santi Ippolito e Cassiano (Pieve dei Santi Ippolito e Cassiano) is located in San Casciano, a village in the municipality of Cascina, Tuscany, Italy. 

It is recorded in a document dated April 12, 970, being part of the Archives of the Roman Catholic Archdiocese of Pisa and probably also in another document dating back to June, in the year 857.

References

10th-century churches in Italy
Churches in the province of Pisa
Romanesque architecture in Tuscany